Tony Hurel (born 1 November 1987) is a French professional road and cyclo-cross racer, who currently rides for UCI Continental team .

Career
In July 2012, Hurel took his first victory for the team, by winning the Polynormande race in France, in a bunch sprint. He was named in the start list for the 2015 Vuelta a España. He returned to the amateur ranks after the 2017 season, signing a deal with Sojasun espoir–ACNC.

Major results

2005
 1st Overall Ronde des Vallées
 1st Overall Circuito Cántabro
2007
 1st Stage 6 Tour de la Nouvelle-Caledonie
2008
 1st Overall Vuelta a la Comunidad de Madrid sub-23
 2nd Prix Gilbert Bousquet
2009
 1st Trophée des Champions
 1st Circuit de la Vallée de la Loire
 2nd Overall Saint Brieuc Agglo-Tour
 2nd Tour du Perigord
 4th Overall Tour de Martinique
1st Stage 8b (ITT)
 6th Paris–Tours Espoirs
2010
 1st Overall Circuit des Plages Vendéennes
1st Stage 4
 1st Paris–Conneré
 1st Grand Prix SADE
 1st Stage 3 Tour de la Manche
 2nd Paris–Chambord–Vailly
 8th Overall Boucles de la Mayenne
2011
 1st Cyclo-cross de Dollon Chpt 72
 1st Cyclo-cross de Bretoncelles
 7th La Roue Tourangelle
2012
 1st Polynormande
 3rd Cyclo cross de Deauville
 10th Tro-Bro Léon
2013
 4th Overall Arctic Race of Norway
 7th Overall Tour de Normandie
2014
 9th Trofeo Ses Salines
 10th Tour de Vendée
2016
 6th Polynormande
 10th Le Samyn
2017
 1st Stage 2 La Tropicale Amissa Bongo
2018
 1st Stage 3 Tour de Bretagne
 4th Overall Tour du Loir-et-Cher
1st Stage 3
 7th Overall Circuit des Ardennes
2019
 2nd Paris–Troyes
 9th Overall Ronde de l'Oise

Grand Tour general classification results timeline

References

External links
Team Europcar profile

Cycling Quotient profile

French male cyclists
Cyclo-cross cyclists
1987 births
Living people
People from Lisieux
Sportspeople from Calvados (department)
Cyclists from Normandy